The Zealots were a political movement in 1st-century Second Temple Judaism which sought to incite the people of Judea Province to rebel against the Roman Empire and expel it from the Holy Land by force of arms, most notably during the First Jewish–Roman War (66–70). Zealotry was the term used by Josephus for a "fourth sect" or "fourth Jewish philosophy" during this period.

Etymology
The term zealot, the common translation of the Hebrew kanai (frequently used in plural form, kana'im), means one who is zealous on behalf of God. The term derives from Greek  (zelotes), "emulator, zealous admirer or follower".

History

Josephus' Jewish Antiquities states that there were three main Jewish sects at this time, the Pharisees, the Sadducees, and the Essenes. The Zealots were a "fourth sect", founded by Judas of Galilee (also called Judas of Gamala) in the year 6 CE against the Census of Quirinius, shortly after the Roman Empire declared what had most recently been the tetrarchy of Herod Archelaus to be a Roman province. According to Josephus, they "agree in all other things with the Pharisaic notions; but they have an inviolable attachment to liberty, and say that God is to be their only Ruler and Lord." (18.1.6)

According to the Jewish Encyclopedia article on Zealots:

Others have also argued that the group was not so clearly marked out (before the first war of 66–70/3) as some have thought.

Simon the Zealot was listed among the apostles selected by Jesus in the Gospel of Luke and in the Acts of the Apostles. He is called Cananaean in Mark and Matthew

Two of Judas of Galilee's sons, Jacob and Simon, were involved in a revolt and were executed by Tiberius Alexander, the procurator of Iudaea province from 46 to 48.

The Zealots had the leading role in the First Jewish–Roman War (66–73 CE). The Zealots objected to Roman rule and violently sought to eradicate it by generally targeting Romans and Greeks. Another group, likely related, were the Sicarii, who raided Jewish habitations and killed Jews they considered apostate and collaborators, while also urging Jews to fight Romans and other Jews for the cause. Josephus paints a very bleak picture of their activities as they instituted what he characterized as a murderous "reign of terror" prior to the Jewish Temple's destruction. According to Josephus, the Zealots followed John of Gischala, who had fought the Romans in Galilee, escaped, came to Jerusalem, and then inspired the locals to a fanatical position that led to the Temple's destruction. They succeeded in taking over Jerusalem, and held it until 70, when the son of Roman Emperor Vespasian, Titus, retook the city and destroyed Herod's Temple during the destruction of Jerusalem.

In the Talmud
In the Talmud, the Zealots are the non-religious (not following the religious leaders), and are also called the Biryonim (בריונים) meaning "boorish", "wild", or "ruffians", and are condemned for their aggression, their unwillingness to compromise to save the survivors of besieged Jerusalem, and their blind militarism against the rabbis' opinion to seek treaties for peace. However, according to one body of tradition, the rabbis initially supported the revolt up until the Zealots initiated a civil war, at which point all hope of resisting the Romans was deemed impossible. The Zealots are further blamed for having contributed to the demise of Jerusalem and the Second Temple, and of ensuring Rome's retributions and stranglehold on Judea. According to the Babylonian Talmud, Gittin:56b, the Biryonim destroyed decades' worth of food and firewood in besieged Jerusalem to force the Jews to fight the Romans out of desperation. This event directly led to the escape of Johanan ben Zakai out of Jerusalem, who met Vespasian, a meeting which led to the foundation of the Academy of Jamnia which produced the Mishnah which led to the survival of rabbinical Judaism. The Zealots advocated violence against the Romans, their Jewish collaborators, and the Sadducees, by raiding for provisions and other activities to aid their cause.

Sicarii

The Sicarii were a splinter group of the Jewish Zealots who, in the decades preceding Jerusalem's destruction in 70 CE, strongly opposed the Roman occupation of Judea and attempted to expel them and their sympathizers from the area. The Sicarii carried sicae, or small daggers, concealed in their cloaks. At public gatherings, they pulled out these daggers to attack Romans and alleged Roman sympathizers alike, blending into the crowd after the deed to escape detection.

According to historian Hayim Hillel Ben-Sasson, the Sicarii, originally based in Galilee, "were fighting for a social revolution, while the Jerusalem Zealots placed less stress on the social aspect" and the Sicarii "never attached themselves to one particular family and never proclaimed any of their leaders king". Both groups objected to the way the priestly families were running the Temple.

Paul the Apostle

While most English translations of the Bible render the Greek word zelotes in Acts 22:3 and Galatians 1:14 of the New Testament as the adjective "zealous", an article by Mark R. Fairchild takes it to mean a Zealot and suggests that Paul the Apostle may have been a Zealot, which might have been the driving force behind his persecution of the Christians (see the stoning of Saint Stephen) before his conversion to Christianity, and the incident at Antioch, even after his conversion. In the two cited verses Paul literally declares himself as one who is loyal to God, or an ardent observer of the Law, but the relationship of Paul the Apostle and Jewish Christianity is still debated. This does not necessarily prove Paul was revealing himself as a Zealot. The Modern King James Version of Jay P. Green) renders it as 'a zealous one'. Two modern translations (the Jewish New Testament and Alternate Literal Translation) render it as 'a zealot'. The Unvarnished New Testament (1991) renders Galatians 1:14 as "being an absolute zealot for the traditions". These translations may not be inaccurate, but it is disputed by those who claim it gives the wrong association with the "Zealots".

See also
 Eifert
 Knanaya
 Sicarii (1989), a modern group inspired by the Sicarii
 Sikrikim, a modern group inspired by the Sicarii
 Zealot: The Life and Times of Jesus of Nazareth, a book about the life of Jesus by Reza Aslan

Notes

External links

 
 

1st century in religion
6 establishments
73 disestablishments
Jews and Judaism in the Roman Empire
Ancient political movements
Early Christianity and Judaism
Jewish nationalism
Jewish rebellions
National liberation movements
Census of Quirinius
First Jewish–Roman War